Isochrysis galbana is a species of Haptophyta. It is the type species of the genus Isochrysis. It is an outstanding food for various bivalve larvae and is now widely cultured for use in the bivalve aquaculture industry. This unicellular is investigated for its high amount of Fucoxanthin (18.23 mg/g dried sample). The Isochrysis galbana extract is said to have certain cosmetic and hair-growth properties when using hexane, ethyl acetate, ethanol, water, methanol, or isopropanol as extractants.  I. galbana has a chloroplast, whose genome sequence has been published in 2020.

References

External links 
ejournal.sinica.edu.tw Ultrastructural study and lipid formation of Isochrysis sp. CCMP1324 (pdf)
www.edpsciences.org Transient initial phase in continuous culture of Isochrysis galbana affinis Tahiti(pdf)
www.irishscientist.ie Marine microalgae as a source of w3 fatty acids

www.plantphysiol.org Expression of the Isochrysis C18-{Delta}9 Polyunsaturated Fatty Acid Specific Elongase Component Alters Arabidopsis Glycerolipid Profiles(pdf)

High lipid content microalgae
Haptophyte species